Daniel Vukovic (born 27 March 1985) is an Australian professional soccer player who plays as a goalkeeper for Central Coast Mariners in the A-League and the Australia national team. Vukovic is the holder of several A-League records: he has the second most clean sheets of any goalkeeper in the A-League (87), he is the only goalkeeper to score in the A-League.

Club career

Central Coast Mariners
Vukovic has previously played for Bonnyrigg White Eagles and Parramatta Power.

Vukovic made his A-League debut for the Central Coast Mariners in September 2005 against Melbourne Victory after the team's first-choice keeper John Crawley suffered a season-ending hip injury. They lost the game 2–1, however Vukovic saved an Archie Thompson penalty and was widely praised for his debut effort. He went on to play 19 more games for the Mariners in the 2005–06 season, achieving five clean sheets, and also saved a penalty from Sydney FC's star player, Dwight Yorke.

Like many Mariners players, Vukovic spends time in schools and at local junior football games, encouraging football at a grassroots level. It was known that Vukovic had desires to play overseas, and it was revealed on 29 June he has signed with TFF First League club Konyaspor.

During the third A-League Grand Final on 24 February 2008, Vukovic received a red card for slapping referee Mark Shield's hand following an alleged handball by Newcastle Jets player James Holland. On the day after the Grand Final, Football Federation Australia (FFA) gave Vukovic a 15-month ban (with 6 months suspended), meaning he would not be able to play in the A-League until 24 November 2008.

On 4 March 2008, this ban was reduced on appeal to 12 months (with 3 months suspended), meaning that if Vukovic re-offended in the following year, the 3-month suspended sentence would be activated. The ban extended to national team duty, which precluded him from competing in the 2008 Summer Olympics with the Australian U-23 team, the Olyroos, which he represented in all Olympic qualifiers for Beijing and had captained on occasion.

Vukovic's ban was appealed a second time and on 22 April 2008 Football Federation Australia announced that the appeals committee had settled on a split suspension; up to 24 June 2008 and then from 29 August through to 5 October 2008. Vukovic was also fined $10,000 and will have a further part of his sentence suspended from 6 October 2008 through to 25 January 2009.

Although Vukovic will be ineligible to play for the Mariners in the early rounds of the 2008–09 A-League season, the decision means he will be eligible for selection for the Australian Olympic team competing in Beijing.

But in June, FIFA re-stated that his ban from International Competition did include a ban on competing in the Olympic Games with the Olyroos. He is banned from International football till 6 October, when the ban is suspended till 25 January 2009 subject to no further infringement up to, and including, 25 January 2009.

Vukovic's 9 month ban remains the longest suspension in A-League history.

Konyaspor
Vukovic signed for the Turkish club on a 2-year deal, but was released on 13 August 2010 after the club found that they had too many overseas players on their books.

Wellington Phoenix
After being released by Konyaspor, Vukovic signed a one-year deal for the remainder of the 2010–11 season with the Wellington outfit, largely due to an injury suffered by back-up goalkeeper Reece Crowther. He initially backed-up regular custodian Mark Paston with occasional appearances, and eventually became first-choice when Paston suffered a season ending knee injury. On 13 February, he scored the first goal of his career and the first for any keeper in the A-League for the Phoenix with a 93rd-minute penalty in the final round clash against the North Queensland Fury.

Perth Glory
Vukovic signed a 3-year deal beginning in the 2011–12 season with Perth Glory. Vukovic was the number one goalkeeper at Perth and enjoyed a successful season as the club made it to their first A-League grand final, losing to Brisbane Roar.

Vegalta Sendai
Vukovic joined Japanese side Vegalta Sendai on a 5-month loan deal. Vukovic but did not make an official appearance for the club, but was on the bench on numerous occasions.

Melbourne Victory

On 4 June 2015, it was confirmed that Vukovic had signed a three-year deal with A-League champions & premiers Melbourne Victory, being a major replacement for departing keepers Nathan Coe and Michael Turnbull. Vukovic revealed that a factor of signing the deal with the Melbourne club was that he & his wife Kristy wanted to live on the Eastern coast of Australia so that their new born child (expected in July 2015) would be raised closer to their respective families from Sydney.

Vukovic agreed to end his contract with Victory after one season on compassionate grounds in July 2016.

Sydney FC
On the day Vukovic parted ways with Melbourne Victory, he signed with Sydney FC on a two-year deal, stating that he made the move to be closer to his family for the sake of his son's health.

Genk
On 21 June 2017, Vukovic transferred to Genk with Sydney FC receiving a club-record transfer fee of almost $1,000,000. On 4 August 2017, he made his debut in a 2–1 loss to Standard Liège. Vukovic made 45 appearances in all competitions during Genk's 2017–18 season and was the surprise recipient of the fan-voted Golden Shoe award for player of the season. On 20 March 2021, it was announced that a contract termination was agreed, to allow Vukovic to return to Australia to support his heavily pregnant wife.

NEC Nijmegen
In June 2021, Vukovic joined Eredivisie club NEC Nijmegen on a two-year contract.

Return to Central Coast Mariners
Vukovic returned to Central Coast Mariners in August 2022. He was named captain of the Mariners in October 2022.

International career
Vukovic played in the Young Socceroos team which won the 2005 OFC U-20 Championship.

He played several matches for the Olyroos, however missed the 2008 Beijing Olympics through suspension.

Vukovic made his debut for the senior team on his 33rd birthday, coming on as a substitute for Brad Jones at half-time against Colombia. He gave away but then saved a penalty in the 86th minute to keep the game to a scoreless draw.

In May 2018 he was named in Australia's 23-man squad for the 2018 FIFA World Cup in Russia. Vukovic was also named in the Australian squad for the 2022 FIFA World Cup in Qatar.

Personal life
Vukovic was born on 27 March 1985 in Sydney to a Serbian family. During an interview with Fox Sports regarding his new deal with Melbourne Victory Vukovic revealed that he and his wife Kristy were expecting their first child in July 2015, stating that they wanted their child to be raised on the eastern coast of Australia, so they could be closer to their respective families, which contributed to the signing the deal with the Melbourne club. His son was diagnosed with biliary atresia soon after birth, and required a liver transplant. This was a contributing factor towards moving to Sydney FC, where he would be closer to their family as well as medical support.

Club statistics

1 – includes A-League final series statistics
2 – AFC Champions League statistics are included in season commencing during group stages (i.e. ACL 2009 and A-League season 2008–09 etc.)

International
Statistics accurate as of match played 7 June 2021.

Honours
Central Coast Mariners
 A-League Premiership: 2007–08
 A-League Pre-Season Challenge Cup: 2005

Melbourne Victory
 FFA Cup: 2015

Sydney
 A-League Premiership: 2016–17
 A-League Championship: 2016–17
 
Genk
 Belgian First Division: 2018–19
 Belgian Super Cup: 2019

Australia
OFC U-20 Championship: 2005

Individual
 Mariners Medal: 2007, 2010
 PFA A-League Team of the Season: 2009–10, 2013–14, 2014–15, 2016–17
 A-League Goalkeeper of the Year: 2016–17
 K.R.C. Genk Player of the Year: 2017–18

References

External links

Profile at Central Coast Mariners

1985 births
Living people
Soccer players from Sydney
Australian people of Serbian descent
Australia youth international soccer players
Australia under-20 international soccer players
Parramatta Power players
Bonnyrigg White Eagles FC players
Central Coast Mariners FC players
Wellington Phoenix FC players
Perth Glory FC players
Melbourne Victory FC players
Sydney FC players
A-League Men players
Konyaspor footballers
J1 League players
Vegalta Sendai players
Belgian Pro League players
K.R.C. Genk players
NEC Nijmegen players
Australian expatriate soccer players
Expatriate footballers in Turkey
Expatriate footballers in Japan
Expatriate footballers in Belgium
Expatriate footballers in the Netherlands
Australian expatriate sportspeople in Turkey
Australian expatriate sportspeople in Japan
Australian expatriate sportspeople in Belgium
2017 FIFA Confederations Cup players
Association football goalkeepers
2018 FIFA World Cup players
Australia international soccer players
2019 AFC Asian Cup players
Australian soccer players
2022 FIFA World Cup players